Apostolos Nikolaidis Stadium, commonly known as Leoforos Alexandras Stadium or Leoforos Stadium, is a football stadium and multi-sport center in Athens, Greece. It was inaugurated in 1922 and is the oldest football stadium in Greece currently active. It is the traditional athletic center of Panathinaikos A.C. and has been the home ground of Panathinaikos FC for the most part of the club's existence.

The stadium is named after the historic club's president, official and athlete Apostolos Nikolaidis. It is situated in the Ambelokipi district of Athens, east of the Lycabettus Hill and on Alexandras Avenue 160, by which name it is most commonly known (Leoforos Alexandras or simply Leoforos, Leoforos meaning Avenue). The stadium's record attendance was recorded in 1967, when 29,665 spectators watched the Cup Winners Cup game between Panathinaikos and FC Bayern Munich.

It also houses several other facilities under its stands, including an indoor hall, a small swimming pool, a boxing ring, an indoor shooting range, the club's offices as well as various other facilities.

History 

Apostolos Nikolaidis Stadium holds a very important place in the history of Greek football. The first stand was built in 1928, and for almost 50 years it hosted the majority of big matches in domestic and international competitions. It was the first to have floodlights installed (1938) and the first with a grass pitch (1958). It was the home of the Greece national football team for many years until 2005.

Panathinaikos FC left Leoforos in 1984 and moved to the Olympic Stadium. The club returned to their home ground in 2001, following an upgrading that cost €7 million.

In 2007, Panathinaikos FC decided to reuse Apostolos Nikolaidis Stadium for the 2007/2008 Greek Super League season.

Due to the stadium's old construction, dearth of space and dense urbanization of the area, the club has sought to move. Negotiations were under way between the Greek government, the Municipality of Athens, and the football, basketball, volleyball and amateur divisions of the club in order to facilitate the building of a new, comprehensive sports complex to house all of the 21 departments of Panathinaikos elsewhere. Finally, the industrial Votanikos district has been selected among others to house the complex and there are plans for the construction to begin in 2008. Athens Mayor Dora Bakoyianni has stated that such a project will revitalise the area as well as benefit the club.

In 2012, bureaucracy problems, such as Panathinaikos' and the country's bad financial situation due to the economic crisis, haven't allowed the construction of the new stadium. President Giannis Alafouzos decided to move the team back from the Athens Olympic Stadium to the historical Leoforos Alexandras for the 2013-14 season. As of October 2013, the plans for the construction of the Votanikos complex have been put on hold.

The current President of the club, Giannis Alafouzos, declared his intention for another renovation of the stadium and the capacity increase, while the Panathinaikos Movement made its propositions for a total reconstruction.

Pavlos and Thanasis Giannakopoulos Indoor Hall 

An indoor hall is located under the East curve of the stadium, below Gates 6 and 7. When it was constructed in 1959, it was the first indoor hall in Greece. It has a capacity of 1,500 and it is famous for the hot atmosphere Panathinaikos fans create in it. During its inauguration ceremony, Tasos Stefanou who was the curator of the Panathinaikos basketball department at the time, mentioned that the gym would create a claustrophobic feeling for the opponents, something that reminded him of the "Indian tomb" pictured on the namesake film by Fritz Lang, that was featured in cinemas during the same time. The comparison was so successful that the nickname "The Indian's Tomb" (pronounced "Tafos tou Indou" in Greek) was immediately adopted and is used until today to informally distinguish the indoor hall from the other facilities of the stadium.

In 2015, the official name of the indoor hall became "Pavlos Giannakopoulos", in honor of the historic former President of Panathinaikos B.C. In 2017, the hall's name was changed to "Pavlos and Thanasis Giannakopoulos", paying tribute to both of the former Presidents of Panathinaikos B.C. and Panathinaikos A.O.

Other facilities 
Apart from the football field and the indoor hall, the stadium is also the home ground of the most sport departments of Panathinaikos, such as the rugby, boxing, fencing, archery, table-tennis, wrestling, weightlifting and shooting departments. There are training rooms, boxing ring, swimming pool, such as an official shop of the football team, pressroom and various cafés.

Gate 13 

Fan seating in Greece is segregated by team allegiance. Gate 13, the subject of much graffiti in Athens, is where the most enthusiastic supporters of Panathinaikos FC sit in the stadium. Gate 13 is known for creating one of the best atmospheres throughout Europe as the stadium has the fans seated directly next to the field and the endless singing even during negative results continuously pushes players to give their maximum. Gate 13 was also a place for the poorest fans and supporters of the team, with the seats not being numbered, unlike the rest of the stadium and the VIP seats. It was officially established on 19 November 1966, although its presence preexisted that date. It is the oldest supporters organization in Greece.

Images

References

External links
 "Apostolos Nikolaidis" stadium History and photos at stadia.gr (in English)

Football venues in Greece
Sports venues in Athens
Multi-purpose stadiums in Greece
Panathinaikos F.C.